Half Moon Bay High School is an American public high school located in Half Moon Bay, in San Mateo County, California.  It is part of the Cabrillo Unified School District.

History
Half Moon Bay High School was founded in August 1909 under the leadership of the school's first principal, Mr. Anderson. Fourteen students registered for classes on the opening day, of whom seven graduated at the school's first commencement in 1912.

Demographics

According to U.S. News & World Report, 51% of Half Moon Bay High School's student body is "of color," with 26% of the student body coming from an economically disadvantaged household, determined by student eligibility for California's Reduced-price meal program.

Curriculum and Standardized Testing
Half Moon Bay High School offers Advanced Placement courses in US History, World History, Spanish, French, US Government, English Language and Composition, English Literature and Composition, Studio Art, Biology, Physics, Calculus and Statistics.

Half Moon Bay High School's graduating senior's SAT scores have consistently averaged well above the overall California state mean. An overwhelming majority of the school's students matriculate to college upon graduation, with the large majority of those electing to attend a school within the California Community College System. 
     

As of 2010, Half Moon Bay High School had an API score of 771.

Athletics
The Cougars compete in the Peninsula Athletic League of the Central Coast Section of the California Interscholastic Federation (CIF). Notably, the football team won the Central Coast Section (CCS) title in 2005, 2015, 2016, and 2017. As well as a 3A Norcal championship in 2017 and being state runners up. The girls basketball team also won a CCS title in 2016. The baseball team has enjoyed success in recent years; this success peaked in 2008 and 2009, when they won the PAL Ocean Division and reached the semifinals of CCS respectively. The boys' basketball team has won 2 CCS Division 4 titles, in 1994 and 1996. The boys' cross country team also has a strong tradition, consistently winning league titles throughout the 70s, 80s, and 90s, with CCS championship titles in 1992, 1994, 1996, 1997, 1998, 1999, 2000, and 2015.

Half Moon Bay High School offers the following sports:
 
Football
Cross Country
Girls' Tennis
Volleyball
Water polo
Cheerleading
Wrestling
Basketball
Soccer
Dance
Baseball
Softball
Golf
Swimming
Boys' Tennis
Track and Field
Gymnastics

Clubs
Half Moon Bay High School offers many different clubs on its campus. Some of the clubs on its campus are: Art Club, Anime Club, Calculus Club, Dodgeball Club, Drama Club, Future Farmers of America, Future Business Leaders of America, Ghost Club, Gay Straight Alliance, Interact Club, Japan Club, Physics Club, Junior Statesmen of America, The Muse, Prom Committee, Puente Club, Snack Club, Seed Club (book drive club), Tea Club, and Surf Club.

References

High schools in San Mateo County, California
Half Moon Bay, California
Public high schools in California
Educational institutions established in 1909
1909 establishments in California